Jules Thiry (1898 – 7 February 1931) was a Belgian water polo player who competed in the 1924 Summer Olympics. In 1924 he won the silver medal with the Belgian water polo team. He played two matches.

See also
 List of Olympic medalists in water polo (men)

References

External links
 

1898 births
1931 deaths
Belgian male water polo players
Olympic water polo players of Belgium
Water polo players at the 1924 Summer Olympics
Olympic silver medalists for Belgium
Olympic medalists in water polo
Medalists at the 1924 Summer Olympics
Place of birth missing